Latvian Naval Forces is the naval warfare branch of the National Armed Forces. It is tasked with conducting military, search and rescue operations, mine and explosive sweeping on the Baltic Sea, as well as ecological monitoring activities. The Naval Forces have participated in international NATO/Partnership for Peace operations and various exercises with great success. The main development priorities of the Naval Forces are to expand their activities within the Baltic States’ Ship Squadron BALTRON and to develop a Sea Surveillance System. They pay a great deal of attention to professionally specialized training and English-language teaching.

History

Independence to World War II 
The Latvian Naval Forces were founded on 10 August 1919 with its first ship being the former Imperial German minesweeper SMS M68. Previously, M68 had been sunk by a mine off Riga on October 29 1917. She was raised in 1918 and taken back to Riga for repairs, but was later seized by forces of the Latvian Socialist Soviet Republic in 1919, before being recaptured by Germany. Upon the conclusion of the Latvian War of Independence, and the victory of the Latvian Provisional Government, M68 was formally commissioned into the Latvian Naval Forces as Virsaitis. She would remain the Latvian Navy's only warship until 1926. 

In 1926, two new Viesturs-class minesweepers, Viesturs and Imanta were ordered from France and commissioned later that year. The same year, two Ronis-class submarines; Ronis and Spīdola, also ordered from France, were commissioned. 

The five ships consisted of the entirety of the Latvian Naval Forces during its first incarnation, as The Great Depression hindered further expansion. The Navy saw no action during its early existence.

In August 1940, the Soviet Union invaded and occupied Latvia, and thus, seized all five Latvian warships. All were reincorporated into the Baltic Fleet. Both submarines retained their names, but Virsaitis was renamed T-297 (her name was restored the following year), Viesturs was renamed T-298, and Imanta was renamed T-299. 

All five ships served in World War II in various roles. Ronis and Spīdola were scuttled in Liepāja on June 24 1941 to prevent their capture by German forces. T-299 struck a mine and sank off Saaremaa on July 1 1941. Virsaitis took part in the evacuation of the Soviet garrison on the Hanko Peninsula in late 1941. On December 2 1941, she struck a mine and sank off Hanko. T-298 was the only former Latvian warship to survive World War II and was later converted to a survey ship in 1948. Her final fate is unknown.

Post-1991 
When Latvia regained its independence in 1991, it began recreating the Latvian Naval Forces under the command of Admiral (then Captain) Gaidis Zeibots. In 1994 the Naval Forces were composed of the Southern Region (in Liepāja), the Central Region (in Riga), the Coastal Defense Battalion (in Ventspils) and the Training Center (in Liepāja). The most important naval event of these early days of the re-established Latvian Republic occurred on 11 April 1991 when the Latvian flag was hoisted on the re-established Navy's first ship "SAMS".  This date is now recognized as the rebirth of the Latvian Naval Forces.

In 1999 the Baltic Naval Squadron (BALTRON) was created with ships from the Lithuanian, Latvian and Estonian Navies.  Latvian Navy Captain Ilmars Lesinskis, then the Commander of the Southern District, was appointed to serve as the first commander of this multi-national force.

On 1 July 1999 Latvian Naval Forces were reorganized. The present structure was established on the basis of previous regional units – the War Ships Flotilla (HQ is in Liepāja), the Coast Guard Ships Flotilla in Riga (subunits are in Liepāja and Ventspils), the Coastal Defense Battalion in Ventspils (subunits are along the coast of the Baltic Sea and Riga Bay), the Training Center in Liepāja, the Logistic Base in Liepāja (subunits are in Riga and Ventspils).

On 1 July 2004 Latvian Naval Forces were reorganized again and since that time they consist of the Naval Forces Headquarters, Naval Forces Flotilla HQ with subunits and the Coast Guard Service. The new structure organizes personnel training and specialization better than before, as well as shares greater responsibility between commanders.

As part of the program to equip the Naval Forces with modern assets, the first of a new generation of nationally made patrol vessels, made with German assistance, was launched in 2011.

Mission 

The Naval Force provides defense of the national territorial waters, carries out explosive ordnance disposal activities at sea and harbors, co-ordinates and carries out human search and rescue operations at sea within the national responsibility area.  Warships of the Republic of Latvia have repeatedly made visits to foreign countries and have supported the visits of foreign warships and naval representatives in Latvia.

The warships of the Latvian Naval Forces Southern Region have participated in numerous international exercises (U.S. BALTOPS, COOPERATIVE JAGUAR, AMBER SEA, OPEN SPIRIT, etc.).  These exercises have been conducted to NATO standards, which Latvian ships have successfully met.

The main tasks of Naval Forces are to:
Ensure the defense of the territorial sea and internal waters of the State (except rivers and lakes);
Perform a guarding of the coast and control the territorial sea and internal waters, as well as the exclusive economic zone;
Ensure the readiness of units for mobilization and combat;
Participate in  ecological surveillance and  search and rescue operations at sea, as well as  take part in  elimination of consequences of emergencies occurring at sea;
Search for explosives at sea and destroy them;
Secure for the State Border Guard according to the procedures specified by the Cabinet, with the technical means and vessels for the performance of their functions at sea.

Structure of the Naval Forces 

 Naval Forces
 Naval Forces Headquarters
 Mine Ship Squadron
 A-53 Virsaitis
 M-04 Imanta
 M-05 Viesturs
 M-06 Tālivaldis
 M-07 Visvaldis
 M-08 Rūsiņš
 Naval Squadron Diver Team
 Patrol Boat Squadron
 A-90 Varonis
 P-05 Skrunda
 P-06 Cēsis
 P-07 Viesīte
 P-08 Jelgava
 P-09 Rēzekne
 Coast Guard Service
 KA-01 Kristaps
 KA-06 Gaisma
 KA-07 Ausma
 KA-08 Saule
 KA-09 Klints
 KA-14 Astra
 Marine Observation and Communication Service
 Baltic Mine Equipment Workshop

Ships in the Naval Forces

Current

Retired

Ranks and insignia

See also 
 Latvian Mercantile Marine during World War II

References

External links 

Latvian Ministry of Defense site
Latvian Naval Forces Site

 
Latvia
Military units and formations established in 1991
1991 establishments in Latvia